The Colgate Champion of Champions was a golf tournament held at Victoria Golf Club, Melbourne in Australia in 1976 and 1977. Prize money was A$150,000.

Winners

References

Former PGA Tour of Australasia events
Golf tournaments in Australia
Golf in Victoria (Australia)
Recurring sporting events established in 1976
Recurring sporting events disestablished in 1977
1976 establishments in Australia
1977 disestablishments in Australia